Burr Oak Township is a township in Jewell County, Kansas, USA. At the 2000 census, its population was 338.

Geography
Burr Oak Township covers an area of 39.41 square miles (102.06 square kilometers). The streams of Burr Oak Creek, Crooked Auger Creek, Walnut Creek and Wolf Creek run through the township.

Cities and towns
 Burr Oak

Adjacent townships
 Walnut Township (north)
 Harrison Township (northeast)
 Holmwood Township (east)
 Center Township (southeast)
 Limestone Township (south)
 Esbon Township (southwest)
 White Mound Township (west)
 Highland Township (northwest)

Cemeteries
The township contains two cemeteries: Baker and Burr Oak.

Major highways
 K-28

References

External links
 US-Counties.com
 City-Data.com
 United States Census Bureau cartographic boundary files

Townships in Jewell County, Kansas
Townships in Kansas